The Ring of Fire is a series of oceanic trenches and volcanoes around the Pacific Ocean.

Ring of Fire may also refer to:

Films, radio, and TV 
 Ring of Fire (1961 film), a crime drama starring David Janssen directed by Andrew L. Stone
 Ring of Fire (1991 film), an IMAX documentary about the Pacific Ring of Fire
 Ring of Fire (2012 TV miniseries), a two-part disaster TV-series featuring Michael Vartan, Terry O'Quinn and Brian Markinson
 Ring of Fire (2013 film), a biographical television film about June Carter Cash and Johnny Cash
 Ring of Fire: An Indonesian Odyssey, 1970s documentary film about Indonesia
 Ring of Fire (radio program), a syndicated American talk show
 "Ring of Fire" (Knight Rider episode), 1983
 "Ring of Fire" (Teenage Mutant Ninja Turtles episode), 1993
 "Ring of Fire", first episode of the 2015 series Thunderbirds Are Go

Literature 
 Ring of Fire (series), a series of alternate history books by Eric Flint and other authors
 Ring of Fire (anthology), a series of short story collections as a part of the above series.  (Ring of Fire II, Ring of Fire III)
 Ring of Fire (Buffy comic), a paperback collection of Buffy the Vampire Slayer comics
 Ring of Fire, one of the Three Rings of Elvenkind in J. R. R. Tolkien's Middle-earth
 Ring of Fire (novel), an Italian young adult fantasy by Pierdomenico Baccalario
 Thunderbirds: Ring of Fire, 1966 tie-in novel for the television series Thunderbirds.

Music 

 "Ring of Fire" (Duane Eddy song), a 1961 song by Duane Eddy from the movie Ring of Fire
 "Ring of Fire" (song), by June Carter Cash, first performed by her sister, Anita Carter, and later covered by Johnny Cash
 Ring of Fire: The Best of Johnny Cash, an album by Johnny Cash
 Ring of Fire (musical), a theater musical on the life of Johnny Cash
 Ring of Fire (Mark Boals album)
 "Ring of Fire", a song by Def Leppard on their 1993 album Retro Active
 Ring of Fire (band), American heavy metal group

Natural science 
 Ring of Fire, a sunflower variety
 Ring of Fire (Northern Ontario), a geographic formation and mining exploration area in Canada
 In atmospheric sciences, thunderstorms that form on the periphery of a high-pressure ridge in summer and can include derechoes
 Appearance of the sun as a bright ring during an annular solar eclipse is called Ring of Fire.

Other uses 
 Ring of Fire (game), a drinking game
 Ring of Fire (ride), an amusement ride
 Ring of Fire Studios, a visual effects, animation, and digital post production studio
 "The Ring of Fire", a nickname of Westpac Stadium, a sports arena in New Zealand
 "Ring of Fire", a nickname of the lighting system of the Dubai International Cricket Stadium, a sports arena in the United Arab Emirates
 "The Ring of Fire companies", a name given to several American companies, especially those based near Los Angeles, that produced cheap handguns known as a Saturday night special

See also
 Wall of Fire (disambiguation)